"Plastic Jesus" is a novella by American writer Poppy Z. Brite, published by Subterranean Press in 2000.  The story concerns Seth Grealy and Peyton Masters, frontmen of the rock and roll band The Kydds.  Seth and Peyton fall deeply in love, and publicly come out after the Stonewall riots, at the cost of controversy and risk to the Kydds' popularity.

The story closely parallels the career of The Beatles, with not only Seth and Peyton standing in for John Lennon and Paul McCartney, but dozens of other Beatles-analogous characters and events.

American novellas
2000 American novels
American LGBT novels
2000s LGBT novels
Novels by Poppy Z. Brite
Subterranean Press books
2000 LGBT-related literary works